Booragoon Lake is a small freshwater lake in suburban Perth, Western Australia.

The lake is situated in the suburb of Booragoon and is bounded by Leach Highway, Lang Street and Aldridge Road. It makes up part of the eastern wetland of the Beeliar Regional Park along with Blue Gum Lake and North Lake.

See also

 List of lakes of Western Australia

References 

Lakes of Perth, Western Australia
Beeliar Regional Park